The Paskuhan Village, officially known as the Philippine Christmas Village also known as Hilaga, is a Christmas-themed park located in San Fernando, Pampanga, Philippines. It is operational all year-round and is under the management of the Tourism Infrastructure and Enterprise Zone Authority.

History

Early operational history
The Paskuhan Village was built on land formerly owned by Jesus Lazatin. Lazatin sold the land to the Philippine Tourism Authority (now the Tourism Infrastructure and Enterprise Zone Authority or TIEZA) in 1989 so it could be utilized to showcase crafts most especially the lantern-making tradition of San Fernando, Pampanga. The theme park was conceptualized by then Pampanga Governor Bren Guiao, then Tourism Secretary Jose Antonio Gonzalez, and then Secretary of Tourism (Philippines)

Opened on December 11, 1990 by then president Corazon Aquino, the Paskuhan Village is meant to showcase small and giant lanterns and other Christmas-related items as an effort to support local craftsmen and entrepreneurs. An "Environmental Consciousness Week" was held at the park in March 1993 to promote environmental awareness, with proceeds directed toward the Pinatubo Trust Fund and the Bahay Pag-Ibig nursing home. During 1998, then First Lady Amelita Ramos decided to recreate the village as part of the "Florikultura '98" project of the Department of Tourism, but soon the year after the plants withered and died. 

Paskuhan Village also served as the venue of the Ligligan Parul or the Giant Lantern Festival from 1990 until 1998.

Decline
The 1991 eruption of Mount Pinatubo as well as the establishment of shopping malls in Pampanga contributed to the decline of Paskuhan. The Ligligan Parul festivities was moved to SM City Pampanga in 2000 and to Robinsons Starmills sometime after 2007.

The Department of Foreign Affairs used to host a consular office which issues passports in Paskuhan until 2002. Paskuhan was converted to the North Philippines Cultural and Historical Village in 2003 which showcased the culture of the Ilocos, Cagayan Valley, Central Luzon and Cordillera regions.

The Pampanga Mayors' League issued a resolution as early as 2009 to start the process to come up with an agreement with the Department of Tourism to acquire management and jurisdiction over Paskuhan.

As of 2012, the Village is financially distressed and almost all shops, restaurants and other features were practically closed, with a budget of only 800 thousand pesos a month and only 24 workers left. By that time Paskuhan has discarded its Northern Luzon theme. The Commission on Audit in a 2012 circular advised TIEZA to rehabilitate, privatize or handover the facility to the local government. Also in the same year the Sangguniang Panlalawigan of Pampanga filed a resolution to establish a branch of Casino Filipino within Paskuhan, a plan opposed by the religious sector, militant organizations, and a parents and teachers association.

2015 sale of Paskuhan
Four SM Group affiliates (SM Development Corp., Premier Central Inc., SM Prime Holdings and SEJ North Premier Holding Corp.) and Robinsons Land Corp. engaged in an open bidding for the purchase of the Paskuhan Village on December 17, 2014. The Pampanga provincial government earlier has also offered to buy the facility at book value or at least acquire administration and operational rights over the property three days earlier. The San Fernando city government also filed a counter proposal to the bid initially contested among five firms.

Premier Central Inc. won the bid and purchased two lots of the Paskuhan Village in May 2015 so that the facility could be redeveloped. However the Village fell to further neglect due to a sales dispute.

House Resolution 654 was filed by Pampanga Third District Representative Aurelio Gonzales Jr. which called for the investigation on Paskuhan's sale. The sale to Premier Central was declared void on October 2, 2017 by Solicitor General Jose Calida. The Committee on Good Government And Public Accountability of the House of Representatives recommended the nullification of the sale for violating the Tourism Act of 2009 which prohibits the sale of state-owned cultural treasures and heritage sites. The body also cited their findings that the right of first refusal entitled to the local governments of Pampanga and its capital city San Fernando was ignored.

Future plans
Following the void of the sale of Paskuhan to Premier Central, San Fernando Mayor Edwin Santiago urged in October 2017 for the revival of the Paskuhan as a Christmas-themed park and the return of the Giant Lantern Festival to the venue although plans of the city to acquire the property is still being deliberated at the time. As of July 2020, majority of Paskuhan Village property was given back to the local government of San Fernando. And in February 2021, a groundbreaking ceremony was held at the former site for the construction of a Giant Lantern Festival-themed tourism and information center.

References

External links

Tourist attractions in Pampanga
Amusement parks in the Philippines
Christmas in the Philippines
Buildings and structures in San Fernando, Pampanga
1990 establishments in the Philippines
Amusement parks opened in 1990